The Assamese alphabet (Oxomiya bornomala) is a writing system of the Assamese language and is a part of the Bengali-Assamese script. This script was also used in Assam and nearby regions for Sanskrit as well as other languages such as Bodo (now Devanagari), Khasi (now Roman), Mising (now Roman), Jaintia (now Roman) etc. It evolved from Kamarupi script. The current form of the script has seen continuous development from the 5th-century Umachal/Nagajari-Khanikargaon rock inscriptions written in an eastern variety of the Gupta script, adopting significant traits from the Siddhaṃ script in the 7th century. By the 17th century three styles of Assamese alphabets could be identified (baminiya, kaitheli and garhgaya) that converged to the standard script following typesetting required for printing.

The Buranjis were written during the Ahom dynasty in the Assamese language using the Assamese alphabet. In the 14th century Madhava Kandali used Assamese alphabets to compose the famous Saptakanda Ramayana, which is the Assamese translation of Valmiki's Sanskrit Ramayana. Later, Sankardev used it in the 15th and 16th centuries to compose his oeuvre in Assamese and Brajavali dialect, the literary language of the bhakti poems (borgeets) and dramas.

The Ahom king Supangmung (1663–1670) was the first ruler who started issuing Assamese coins for his kingdom. Some similar scripts with minor differences are used to write Maithili, Bengali, Meithei and Sylheti.

History

The Umachal rock inscription of the 5th century evidences the first use of a script in the region. The script was very similar to the one used in Samudragupta's Allahabad Pillar inscription. Rock and copper plate inscriptions from then onwards, and Xaansi bark manuscripts right up to the 18th–19th centuries show a steady development of the Assamese alphabet. The script could be said to develop proto-Assamese shapes by the 13th century. In the 18th and 19th century, the Assamese script could be divided into three varieties: Kaitheli (also called Lakhari in Kamrup region, used by non-Brahmins), Bamuniya (used by Brahmins, for Sanskrit) and Garhgaya (used by state officials of the Ahom kingdom)—among which the Kaitheli style was the most popular, with medieval books (like the Hastir-vidyrnava) and sattras using this style. In the early part of the 19th century, Atmaram Sarmah designed the first Assamese script for printing in Serampore, and the Bengali and Assamese lithography converged to the present standard that is used today.

Assamese symbols

Vowels
The script presently has a total of 11 vowel letters, used to represent the eight main vowel sounds of Assamese, along with a number of vowel diphthongs. All of these are used in both Assamese and Bengali, the two main languages using the script. Some of the vowel letters have different sounds depending on the word, and a number of vowel distinctions preserved in the writing system are not pronounced as such in modern spoken Assamese or Bengali. For example, the Assamese script has two symbols for the vowel sound  and two symbols for the vowel sound . This redundancy stems from the time when this script was used to write Sanskrit, a language that had a short  and a long , and a short  and a long . These letters are preserved in the Assamese script with their traditional names of hôrswô i (lit. 'short i') and dirghô i (lit. 'long i'), etc., despite the fact that they are no longer pronounced differently in ordinary speech.

When no vowel is written, the vowel  (ô or o) is often assumed. To specifically denote the absence of a vowel, may be written underneath the consonant.

Consonants

The names of the consonant letters in Assamese are typically just the consonant's main pronunciation plus the inherent vowel ô. Since the inherent vowel is assumed and not written, most letters' names look identical to the letter itself (e.g. the name of the letter  is itself  ghô). Some letters that have lost their distinctive pronunciation in Modern Assamese are called by a more elaborate name. Similarly, the phoneme  can be written as  taloibbo xo ("palatal x"),  murdhoinno xo ("retroflex x"), or  dontia xo ("dental x"), the phoneme  can be written using  prothom sô ("first s") or  ditio so ("second s"), and the phoneme  can be written using  borgia zo ("row z" = "the z included in the five rows of stop consonants") or  ontostho zo ("z situated between" = "the z that comes between the five rows of stop consonants and the row of sibilants"), depending on the standard spelling of the particular word.

Assamese or Asamiya consonants include thirty three pure consonant letters in Assamese alphabet and each letter represents a single sound with an inherent vowel, the short vowel /a /.

The first twenty-five consonants letters are called sporxo borno. These sporxo bornos are again divided into five borgos. Therefore, these twenty-five letters are also called borgio borno.

The Assamese consonants are typically just the consonant's main pronunciation plus the inherent vowel o. The inherent vowel is assumed and not written, thus, names of most letters look identical to the letter itself (e.g. the name of the letter ঘ is itself ঘ gho).

Some letters have lost their distinctive pronunciation in modern Assamese are called by a more elaborate name. For example, since the consonant phoneme /n/ can be written ন, ণ, or ঞ (depending on the spelling of the particular word), these letters are not simply called no; instead, they are called ন dointo no ("dental n"), ণ murdhoinno no ("cerebral n"), and ঞ nio.

Similarly, the phoneme /x/ can be written as শ taloibbo xo ("palatal x"), ষ murdh9inno xo ("cerebral x"), or স dointo xo ("dental x"), the phoneme /s/ can be written using চ prothom so ("first s") or ছ ditio so ("second s"), and the phoneme /z/ can be written using জ borgio zo ("row z" = "the z included in the five rows of stop consonants") or য ontostho zo ("z situated between" = "the z that comes between the five rows of stop consonants and the row of sibilants"), depending on the standard spelling of the particular word.

The consonants can be arranged in following groups:

Group: 1 – Gutturals    

Group: 2 – Palatals

Group: 3 – Cerebrals or Retroflex

Group: 4 – Dentals   

Group: 5 – Labials   

Group: 6 – Semivowels   

Group: 7 – Sibilants   

Group: 8 – Aspirate   

Group: 9 – Anuxāra   

Group: 9 – Bixarga   

Group: 10 – Candrabindu (anunāsika)    

The letters শ (talôibbya xô), ষ (murdhôinnya xô), স (dôntiya xô) and হ (hô) are called usma barna
 The letters য (za), ৰ (ra), ল (la) and ৱ (wa) are called ôntôsthô barna
The letters ড় (daré ṛa) and ঢ় (dharé ṛha) are phonetically similar to /ra/
The letter য (ôntôsthô zô) is articulated like 'ôntôsthô yô' in the word medial and final position. To denote the ôntôsthô ẏô, the letter য় (ôntôsthô ẏô) is used in Assamese
 ৎ (khanda ṯ) means the consonant letter Tö (dôntiya ta) without the inherent vowel

Halant 
To write a consonant without the inherent vowel the halant sign is used below the base glyph. In Assamese this sign is called haxanta. (্)

Consonant Conjuncts
In Assamese, the combination of three consonants is possible without their intervening vowels. There are about 122 conjunct letters. A few conjunct letters are given below:

Anuxôr 
Anuxôr ( ং ) indicates a nasal consonant sound (velar). When an anuxar comes before a consonant belonging to any of the 5 bargas, it represents the nasal consonant belonging to that barga.

Candrabindu 
Chandrabindu ( ঁ ) denotes nasalization of the vowel that is attached to it .

Bixargô 
Bixargô ( ঃ ) represents a sound similar to /h /.

Consonant clusters according to Goswami
According to Dr. G. C. Goswami the number of two-phoneme clusters is 143 symbolised by 174 conjunct letters. Three phoneme clusters are 21 in number, which are written by 27 conjunct clusters. A few of them are given hereafter as examples:

Digits

Three distinct variations of Assamese script from the Bengali

Though  is used in Bengali as a conjunct letter. Cha or Chha too has different pronunciation.

Assamese keyboard layout
 Inscript keyboard layout:

 Phonetic keyboard layout:

 The unique letter identifiers:

The keyboard locations of three characters unique to the Assamese script are depicted below:

 ITRANS characterisation:

The "Indian languages TRANSliteration" (ITRANS) the ASCII transliteration scheme for Indic scripts here, Assamese; the characterisations are given below:

Sample text 
The following is a sample text in Assamese of Article 1 of the Universal Declaration of Human Rights:

Assamese in Assamese alphabet

Assamese in Romanisation 1
Prôthôm ônussêd: Zônmôgôtôbhawê xôkôlû manuh moirjyôda aru odhikarôt xôman aru sôtôntrô. Têû̃lûkôr bibêk asê, buddhi asê. Têû̃lûkê proittêkê proittêkôk bhratribhawê byôwôhar kôra usit.

Assamese in Romanisation 2
Prothom onussed: Jonmogotobhabe xokolü manuh moirjjoda aru odhikarot xoman aru sotontro. Teü̃lükor bibek ase, buddhi ase. Teü̃lüke proitteke proittekok bhratribhawe bebohar kora usit.

Assamese in Romanisation 3
Prothom onussed: Jonmogotovawe xokolu' manuh morjjoda aru odhikarot xoman aru sotontro. Teulu’kor bibek ase, buddhi ase. Teulu’ke proitteke proittekok vratrivawe bewohar kora usit.

Assamese in common chatting romanisation
Prothom onussed: Jonmogotobhawe xokolu manuh morjyoda aru odhikarot xoman aru sotontro. Teulukor bibek ase, buddhi ase. Teuluke proitteke proittekok bhratribhawe byowohar kora usit.

Assamese in IAST Romanisation
Prathama anucchēda: Janmagatabhāve sakalo mānuha maryadā āru adhikārata samāna āru svatantra. Tēõlokara bibēka āchē, buddhi āchē. Tēõlokē pratyēkē pratyēkaka bhrātribhāvē byavahāra karā ucita.
Assamese in the International Phonetic Alphabet

Gloss
1st Article: Congenitally all human dignity and right-in equal and free. their conscience exists, intellect exists. They everyone everyone-to brotherly behaviour to-do should.

Translation
Article 1: All human beings are born free and equal in dignity and rights. They are endowed with reason and conscience. Therefore, they should act towards one another in a spirit of brotherhood.

Unicode

The Bengali–Assamese script was added to the Unicode Standard in October 1991 with the release of version 1.0.

The Unicode block for Assamese and Bengali is U+0980–U+09FF:

See also
 Assamese Braille
 Help:IPA for Assamese
 Romanisation of Assamese

Notes

References

Further reading

External links
 Assamese alphabet
 Madhava Kandali Ramayana

Assamese language
Assamese scripts
Officially used writing systems of India